Shahu I (Shahu Sambhaji Raje Bhosale;) was the fifth Chhatrapati of the Maratha Empire founded by his grandfather, Chhatrapati Shivaji Maharaj. He was born into the Bhonsle family, and was the son of Chhatrapati Sambhaji Maharaj, Shivaji Maharaj's eldest son and successor. At a young age, he was taken into custody at the Siege of Raigad by Mughal emperor Aurangzeb, and held captive by the Mughals. He was released from captivity after the death of Aurangzeb in the hope of engineering an internecine struggle among the Maratha factions of Tarabai and Shahu Raja. Raja Shahu emerged victorious in the bloody Battle of Khed and was crowned the Chhatrapati.

Under Chhatrapati Shahu Maharaj's reign, Maratha power and influence extended to all corners of the Indian subcontinent and created a strong Maratha Empire. After his death, his ministers and generals such as the Peshwa Bhats and their lieutenants of Shinde and Holkar house, Senasahibsubha Bhonsles of Nagpur, and Senakhaskhel Gaikwad of Baroda administered their own sectors of the empire under loose direction of the future Chhatrapati.

Early life 

In 1689, at the age of seven, Shahu was taken prisoner along with his mother by Mughals after the Battle of Raigarh. Aurangzeb was fighting the decentralised Marathas and hoped to use the crown heir Shahu as a pawn in his battle. Therefore, he treated Shahu and his mother well. Even in Mughal captivity, Shahu's mother, Queen Yesubai, continued to rule her private territories as a Deshmukh. Shahu married two daughters of high ranking Maratha Sardars in the Mughal service. Aurangzeb gifted Shahu the Bhavani sword of Shivaji, the sword of Afzal Khan, and another gold-hilted sword. Aurangzeb also granted him Sanads to lands and revenue rights around Parganas of Akkalkot, Supa, Baramati, and Nevase for his maintenance. After Aurangzeb's death in 1707, one of his sons, Prince Azam Shah, released Shahu in the hope of starting an internecine conflict between the Marathas, and also to have Shahu on his side for his own succession battle for the Mughal throne. At that time, his aunt Tarabai, who governed the Maratha realm in the name of her son Shivaji, denounced Shahu as an impostor substituted by the Mughals for the son of Sambhaji. Shahu then waged a civil-war against Tarabai to gain the Chhatrapati's throne in 1708 and emerged victorious.

Accession

Early Reign 

Following the death of Aurangzeb, Shahu grew impatient about returning to his homeland. He was advised by Zinat-un-Nissa and Zulfiqar Khan to not wait for formal sanads of appointment from Azam Shah, but to quit the Mughal camp at once and proceed to his home country. He readily acted upon this advice and left the Mughal camp at Doraha on 8th May 1707. The princes of Bharatpur, Jodhpur, Udaipur, and Jaipur received Shahu on his way to Maharashtra with warm hospitality. Shahu visited the sacred city of Ujjain and paid his obeisance to Shri Mahakaleshwar. At Burhanpur, Jotyaji Kaskar was left behind by Shahu to receive the sanads from the Mughals. Shahu then arrived at Bijagad, about thirty miles south of Narmada, and was joined by its ruler Rawal Mohansinh, who had long rebelled against Aurangzeb and cooperated with the Marathas. Mohansinh was the first to espouse the cause of Shahu and help him with troops and funds. From Bijagad, Shahu proceeded to Sultanpur, where he was joined by several Maratha chiefs such as Amritrao Kadambande, Rawal Sujansinh of Lamkani, the Bokils, the Purandares. and other Brahmin families.

Kollapur Succession

Early Conflicts 
After reaching Maharashtra, Senasahibsubha Parsoji Bhonsle, commandor of 15,000 troops, pledged himself to Shahu. Parsoji’s example was quickly followed by Sardar Nimaji Shinde, Sarlashkar Haibatrao Nimbalkar, Rustumrao Jadhavrao (Shahu’s father-in-law), and Chimnaji Damodar who were all operating in Baglana and Khandesh. The forces of Tarabai assembled near Kudas Khed for a confrontation.

On 3 August 1707, Jotyaji Kesarkar received the formal sanads for Raja Shahu at Burhanpur from Bahadur Shah, who had finally killed Azam Khan in the Battle of Jajau. Shahu and his successors were recognized by the Mughal Emperors as the rightful heirs to Chattrapati Shivaji Maharaj. The Mughals of Delhi yielded a quarter of their total revenue as Chauth tax, and an additional 10% for their protection to Chhatrapati Shahu. They would later become a puppet government of the Marathas.

Battle of Khed 
On his march from Pune to the field of Khed Kudus, Shahu faced resistance from the town of Parad, which had a small fortress from which a feeble cannonade was directed upon his forces by the Patil Sayaji Lokhande. The fortress was stormed and levelled to the ground, and the besieged were put to the sword. Patil Sayaji's widow placed her son Ranoji in Shahu's palanquin. Shahu, who regarded this as his first victory, named the boy Fatesinh and adopted him as his own son. Upon reaching Khed, Shahu sneaked into Dhanaji Jadhav's camp in disguise and had an interview with Dhanaji's comptroller Naroram Ranga Rao, who held favor of his master. Naroram represented the legitimacy of Shahu's claims to the Maratha throne and persuaded Dhanaji to espouse the right cause at the right time. Thereafter, Dhanaji also pledged his allegiance to Shahu. The Battle of Khed then took place on 12th October 1707 between the forces of Tarabai and Raja Shahu, who personally commanded his contingents. Tarabai's forces were led by Pratinidhi Parshuram Trymbak and Sarsenapati Khanderao Dabhade and suffered major casualties, while Dhanaji Jadhav only engaged in nominal skirmishes due to his prior oath of allegiance to Shahu. Shahu thus achieved a resounding victory causing Parshuram Trymbak Pratinidhi to flee to Satara Fort. Following the battle, Shahu visited the Khandoba Temple at Jejuri to pay homage and assumed the title "Kshatriyakulavatansa Sriyut Raja Shahu Chhatrapati".
Shahu, riding on a wave of success, went on to capture Raigad, Torna, Vichitragad, and Chandan-Vandan forts, along with a few minor ones, in record time. Within a month of the Battle of Khed, he then appeared before Satara. Camped at the foot of Satara Fort, in almost the exact place where Aurangzeb had camped seven years earlier, Shahu sent off a peremptory demand to Tarabai's Pratinidhi to surrender the fort without resistance. However, since the latter would not yield, Shahu laid siege to it. Determined to conquer it in eight days, Shahu discovered that the military commander (Havaldar) of the fort, Sheikh Mira, had kept his family in Wai, a village not far from his camp. Shahu decided to apply a judicious ploy and threatened Sheikh Mira, saying that he would blow off the Sheikh's wife and children from the mouth of cannons if he did not surrender the fortress. Sheikh Mira then showed his readiness to do the bidding of Shahu. However, since the Pratinidhi resisted, Sheikh Mira, in a minor coup, threw him into prison and opened the gates to Shahu on 1 January 1708. It is said that even Dhanaji Jadhav, who had seen Aurangzeb’s vast army battering against the fort of Satara for nine months before it capitulated, is said to have expressed surprise at the ease and rapidity with which Shahu managed to conquer it. Satara thus became the capital of Shahu's realms.

Relations with the Peshwas

Relations with Balaji Vishwanath 

Kanhoji Angre seized the opportunity of warring between Tarabai and Shahu to effectively free himself of the suzerainty of either. Instead, he captured the major trading center of Kalyan, and the neighboring forts of Rajmachi and Lohagad. Shahu sent a large force under his Peshwa, or Prime Minister, Bahiroji Pingale. Kanhoji defeated Pingale, imprisoned him at Lohagad, and started to advance towards Shahu's capital of Satara. Shahu commanded his Senakarta Balaji Vishwanath to raise another standing army (Huzurat) to subdue opponents. Balaji preferred the path of negotiation and was appointed as Shahu's plenipotentiary to negotiate with the admiral. Balaji and Kanhoji met at Lonavala. The newly appointed Peshwa appealed to the old sailor's patriotism for the Maratha cause. Angre agreed to become the Sarkhel (grand admiral) of Shahu's navy with control of the Konkan. Balaji and Angre then jointly attacked the Muslim Siddis of Janjira. Their combined forces captured most of the Konkan coast, including Balaji's birthplace of Shrivardhan, which became part of the Angre fiefdom. Delighted with Balaji's success, Shahu dismissed Bahiroji Pingale, and appointed Balaji Vishwanath as Peshwa on 16 November 1713.

Upon the death of Athani's Maratha lord Himmat Bahadur Vithoji Chavan, his son Udaji Chavan succeeded to his fief and his title of Himmat Bahadur. During the Maratha-Mughal Wars, Udaji's father had been a close friend of Ramchandra Amatya and Ramchandra, and Udaji had joined the faction of Tarabai (and thereby of her son Sambhaji). From his castle at Battis Shirale, Udaji frequently mounted raids in Shahu's territories, terming the exactions as the "Chavan Chauth". In the 1730s, after the death of Senapati Trymbakrao Dabhade and Bajirao's distant campaigns, Udaji Chavan obtained sanction from Tarabai's son Sambhaji to lead a force across the Warana river against Shahu. He pitched his camp at Shirol and began to plunder the countryside. Shahu, who was hunting in the neighborhood, sent for Udaji Chavan, promising him a safe conduct. After receiving bitter chiding by Shahu for his actions, Udaji Chavan decided to having him assassinated. A few days later, four assassins entered Shahu's tent, who was seated alone. Shau was so indifferent to the danger posed by the assassins that the assassins lost heart and threw down their guns at his feet, pleading for mercy. Shahu enquired about their employer and they admitted that they had been sent by Udaji Chavan. Shahu gave each of the assassins a gold bracelet, and made them pick up their arms and take them back to Udaji along with a certificate from himself that stated they were good and faithful servants while deciding to mount up the conflict against Sambhaji. Shambhusimha Jadhav and Pratinidhi launched a rapid assault on Sambhaji's camp at Warana riverbanks and wiped out most of the Kolhapur army. All of Sambhaji’s military chest and stores were captured by the Pratinidhi. Tarabai, Rajasbai, Sambhaji’s wife Jijabai, Bhagwantrao Ramchandra, and Vyankatrao Joshi were taken as prisoners to Chhatrapati Shahu who chivalrously sent Sambhaji’s mother and wife to Panhala. The dispirited Tarabai chose to reside with Shahu in the palace prepared for her at Satara, concluding her role in the civil war. Shahu's forces took Vishalgad next, compelling Sambhaji to agree to a conclusive treaty.

An open field known as the Jakhinwadi plain was chosen as the meeting place of the two cousins. Jakhinwadi was bedecked with pavilions and equipage of the nobles of Maharashtra, who on this occasion, vied with each other in the splendour of their trappings and the profusion of their jewelry. There were over 200,000 soldiers, alone with horses and countless baggage trains. On the appointed day, Shahu and Sambhaji set out from their respective camps on elephants with jewel-studded howdahs. When they came in sight of each other, their elephants kneeled and their riders left them to mount richly saddled Arab steeds. When the horses met, the two princes alighted. Sambhaji put his head on Shahu’s feet as a visible token of submission. Chhatrapati Shahu bent down and lifting up his cousin and embraced him. Then, Shahu and Sambhaji decked each other with golden coins and garlands of flowers bringing the ceremony to a close. The formal treaty was concluded two months later at Satara known as "Treaty of Warana", which terminated the Maratha Civil War, and made Kolhapur a firmly subordinate sector of Satara Chhatrapati's empire. Fatehsingh Bhonsle was ordered to escort Sambhaji back to Panhala. Shahu accompanied Sambhaji for eight miles, and both were ablaze with the jewels and silks of the nobles in the train of the two monarchs. According to scholar C. A. Kincaid: "Even the splendours of the French nobles, when Henry met Francis on the Field of the Cloth of Gold, would have paled before the magnificence of Sambhaji’s reception by Shahu."

Later Peshwas 

Over the next fifty years, Peshwa Balaji's son, Bajirao I, and grandson, Balaji Bajirao, expanded Maratha power in all directions of the Indian subcontinent. The Battle of Palkhed was fought on 28 February 1728 at the village of Palkhed, near Nashik, Maharashtra, India, between the Maratha Empire and the Nizam-ul-Mulk, Asaf Jah I of Hyderabad, wherein the Marathas defeated the Nizam. After the Battle of Bundelkhand, the Marathas became major players in the Ganga-Yamuna Doab. During Shahu's lifetime, Marathas conquered Bundelkhand, Bundi, Malwa, Gujarat, Gwalior, Kota, and the Ganga-Yamuna Doab.

Shahu advanced the interests of the ryots and brought barren tracts under cultivation, encouraged the plantation of trees, and relieved the suffering of the poor classes by abolishing irksome taxes.

Shahu, widely regarded as "Bhola Shankar" (benevolent incarnation of Shiva), was reputed for his proverbial equitable disposition, and freely socialised with civilians. During festivals, celebrations, dinners, and marriage ceremonies, Shahu was famous for taking an active role and observing how his people fared. People across all classes felt entitled to invite him for their intimate life events like marriages or other celebrations, and he heartily joined them, spent for them, and aided them whenever help was needed. Shahu was titled "Punyashloke" (of pious legacy) by more than one contemporary writer. He was extolled for appointing qualified officers and delegating due authority while also censuring misdeeds appropriately. He appeared in public dressed in the same plain white garments as in private life, with long grey hairs which hung down gracefully on his shoulders. There was virtually nothing private about his life and he was approachable for any civilian. He travelled around his empire on horseback, or his palanquin with a slender retinue, with his secretary and clerks always accompanying him.

His daily routine was a permanent fixture. The poor had free access to him and received quick and impartial justice. He never disregarded any impromptu lowest-class applicants, and on his tours he stopped his palanquin whenever he saw anyone making an appeal to him. As a rule, Shahu went out hunting every morning, which was his only exercise and mode of recreation. Breakfast was followed by office work, where the Chhatrapati carefully disposed of every matter that came before him, and patiently heard every petition that was submitted. At the lighting time in the evening, a full Court was held, after formal obeisance had first been made to Agni. Music and dancing concluded the day. It was computed that Chhatrapati Shahu passed orders on at least 500 matters or cases every day.

Family

Shahu had four wives, two sons, and four daughters. 

His Shirke queens, Sakwarbai and Sagunabai, owned their own residences called 'Dareemi Mahal' and 'Dhakta Mahal', respectively. They had their own 'Chitnis/Chitnavis' ministers to look after their establishments. They derived their income from the 'Watans', certain privileges and trade revenue being carried on in ports of Colaba district called 'Khadi of Kundalika'. They had also received 'Sanads' from the Chhatrapati to carry on the trade in different precious commodities such as fish, salt, rice, spices, and cocoa-nuts to and from their tax-free ports of Roha and Ashtami. Disturbances, attacks, and onslaughts by Abyssinians, Europeans were frequent. The queens were often requested to check the nefarious activities of many upstarts with military support. Accounts reveal that the queens were well informed of the events taking place on the Western Indian coast, and that they maintained close contact with influential Maratha Sardars and other figures like Brahmendra Swami to maintain their hold over the political situation of Konkan sphere.

Shahu adopted Parvati Kolhatkar when she was 3 years old. She was the daughter of a Konkanastha Brahmin mamledar of Pen, Raigad. He trained her in warfare and administration. He later had her married to Sadashivrao Bhau when she was 15 years old. Even though her father was alive, he performed her kanyadan. He also adopted two sons, Ranoji Lokhande who was renamed Fatehsinh I, and Rajaram II of Satara (who succeeded him as Ramaraja Chhatrapati). Rajaram II had been brought to him by Shahu's paternal aunt, Tarabai, who initially claimed that the young man was her grandson and thus a descendant of Shivaji Maharaj, but later disowned him as an imposter when he would not be a pawn for her politics. Ultimately, she admitted to his legitimacy in the presence of other Maratha Sardars. Due to the controversy of this event, after Shahu's death, Tarabai vengefully arrested Ramaraja Chhatrapati to take over Satara court. Thus, the executive powers were indirectly legitimised with the Pune-based Peshwa Balaji Bajirao.

Shahu had adopted Ranoji Lokhande, later known as Fatehsinh I Raje Sahib Bhonsle, the son of Meherban Sayaji Lokhande, the Patil of Parud. Sayaji Patil had died in Chhatrapati Shahu's sack of Parud during the Maratha civil war, and his mother handed him over to Shahu who was seated on his palanquin. Fatehsinh thus became the first Raja of Akkalkot around the year 1708. Upon his adoption, Fatehsinh received the town of Akkalkot and surrounding areas. The descendants of Fatehsinh later went on to establish the Lokhande Bhonsle dynasty in Akkalkot state of Maharashtra.

Legacy, death and succession
Satara (Sapta Tara) was the name of the citadel, while the capital city below the fort was actually named Shahunagar. Shahu shifted his throne from the citadel to the city's Rangmahal Palace in 1721. He supplied the new city with good drinking water brought in pipes from the Mahadara and Yavteshvar hills. There was also a mint established in the city. 

Shahu was fond of sports such as hunting wild game and shooting birds, and used to have a daily ride outside Satara into the jungles for this purpose, thereby getting both fresh air and exercise. During the monsoon season this was accompanied by fishing. Shahu patronised singers, instrument-players, bards, and actors. He kept well-trained hounds and was particular about their pedigree. He was equally fond of well bred horses and birds, and knew their qualities and features. Rarities of various kinds such as candles, scents, knives, swords, tobacco, gunpowder used to be ordered by him through his admiral Kanhoji Angre from European traders. He also purchased elephant tusks. He was equally fond of good gardens, and ordered the planting of rare fruit and flower trees imported from different places. 

Chhatrapati Shahu died on 15 December 1749 in Shahunagar. In his records after Shahu's death, Malhar Chitnis states, "He was a father and protector to young and old, to man and woman, to nobles and servants, great and small. Such a King never lived before. Under his government even criminals were not harshly treated. He had no enemy. Unprecedented lamentations were heard." 

A statue of Chhatrapati Shahu was erected over his cremation spot.  

Many stories were told of Shahu's lavish generosity, and his court he used to compare him with Karna, a hero of the Indian epic Mahabharata. 

Muzaffar Jang, Nizam-ul-mulk's grandson, is recorded to have spoken the following eulogy when he heard of Shahu's death. "Shahu at the Maratha Court, and Nizam-ul-mulk at the Mughal Court, are the only two great men, the like of whom is hardly to be met with. He carefully looked after the interests of his State: There has been no equal to him. He rightly deserves the title of "enemy-less" (Ajatashatru). By selecting right men for right duties Shahu increased the valour of his soldiers and giving them ample field for expansion, extended the Maratha dominions in all quarters of India, thus fulfilling the ardent wishes of his grandfather Shivaji. One peculiar trait of Shahu's character was that he felt the highest pleasure in making others happy, not only his dependents and subjects, but even aliens in race, religion and rule. Himself living a plain frugal ascetic's life, he felt highly rejoiced in seeing people enjoying their various trades and avocations. Indeed he could be called a saint in this respect. Even when faced with murderers that came to attack him, he let them go unpunished and thus created a genuine feeling of reverence for his personality in the minds of the public." 

At that time of his death, his widow Sakvarbai and his concubines committed sati because of political intrigues between Tarabai and Peshwa Balaji Baji Rao regarding succession at the Satara court. His adopted son Rajaram II of Satara, claimed by Tarabai to be her grandson, succeeded the Satara throne. However, actual power was held first by Tarabai, and then by Peshwa Balaji Baji Rao.

References

Bibliography

External links
 Imperial Gazetteer of India, v. 2, p. 441.
 Kasar, D.B. Rigveda to Raigarh making of Shivaji the great, Mumbai: Manudevi Prakashan, Rs. 165 (2005).
 Akkalkot, Solapur district gazette 

Chattrapati Shahuji
Chattrapati Shahuji
Maharajas of Satara
18th-century Indian monarchs